Eastern Washington University (EWU) is a public university in Cheney, Washington. It also offers programs at a campus in EWU Spokane at the Riverpoint Campus and other campus locations throughout the state.

Founded in 1882, the university is academically divided into four colleges: the College of Arts, Humanities & Social Sciences; the College of Health Science & Public Health; the College of Professional Programs; and the College of Science, Technology, Engineering & Mathematics.

History
The city of Cheney, then known as Depot Springs, was surveyed in 1880 along the tracks of the Northern Pacific Railroad; expressman Benjamin Pierce Cheney was a member of that railroad's board of directors. Officials renamed the city for Cheney by October 1880, prompting him to donate $10,000 to establish the Benjamin P. Cheney Academy in 1882 on an  site at present-day Showalter Hall. At the time, the school was a private institution losing pupils to the competing public school district; after Washington was admitted to the union in 1889, the Enabling Act allowed the establishment of normal schools in the new state and in 1890 the school was renamed the State Normal School at Cheney to train future elementary school teachers. The first class of teachers began their studies on October 13, 1890, under the administration of W. W. Gillette (principal) and William J. Sutton (vice principal).

The campus was almost totally destroyed twice by fire in 1891 and 1912, but was rebuilt each time. On August 27, 1891, while the original 1882 Cheney Academy building was being expanded, the first fire destroyed the building and unfinished addition, and classes were moved to the Pomeroy building in downtown Cheney temporarily. Sutton took over as principal in 1892 and spearheaded an appropriation of $60,000 in 1895 from the state for a new building, completed in 1896 at the site of the former Academy building. Sutton resigned in 1897, and shortly afterward, Governor John R. Rogers vetoed funding for the fledgling school, forcing it to cancel classes for the 1897–98 school year. Locals provided enough funding to operate the school in 1898, and state funding resumed in 1899.

Noah D. Showalter was elected president of the Normal School in 1911, just before the second fire destroyed the 1896 building on April 24, 1912. Like Sutton before him, Showalter urged the state to pass an appropriation of $300,000 to pay for a new building; after Governor Ernest Lister vetoed the appropriation, the veto was overridden by the legislature under the leadership of Sutton, then serving as a State Senator.

Julius Zittel was selected to design the new administration building, which was dedicated on May 22, 1915, and later renamed to Showalter Hall in 1940. The Herculean Pillars, at the intersection of 5th and College, were also completed in 1915, using materials salvaged from the 1896 Normal School building, and served as the entrance to the school for those arriving from the downtown train station.

Cheney Normal School continued to grow, opening its first dormitories in 1916 (Monroe Hall), 1920 (Senior Hall), and 1923 (Sutton Hall); in 1929, it completed the President's House (now University House), to serve as the residence for the school's president. All were designed by Zittel. After Zittel's retirement, Charles I. Carpenter and George M. Rasque were hired to design a replacement for the Training School, where student teachers would practice teaching; the new building, dedicated on April 9, 1937, was named Martin Hall to honor Governor and local resident Clarence Martin. Also that same year, Cheney Normal School was renamed to Eastern Washington College of Education. On June 4, 1940, the new campus library was opened as Hargreaves Hall (designed by Rasque), and the former administration building was formally dedicated to Noah Showalter.

The school grew quickly in size following World War II and became Eastern Washington State College in 1961. During this era, Eastern added various graduate and undergraduate degree programs. In 1977, the school's name was changed for the final time to Eastern Washington University by the Washington State Legislature.

In 1992, the core of the campus was listed on the National Register of Historic Places as the Washington State Normal School at Cheney Historic District.

Campus locations
The main campus of Eastern Washington University is located in Cheney. A branch campus, known as the Riverpoint Campus is located nearby in Spokane and is shared with Washington State University.

EWU also offers degree programs located in Bellevue, Everett, Seattle, Longview, and Vancouver (Washington).

Academics

EWU offers over 100 fields of study, 10 master's degrees, seven graduate certificates, 55 graduate programs of study and an applied doctoral program of physical therapy. A master's in social work is offered in Everett and Vancouver, and a master's in education is available in Kent. A creative writing Master of Fine Arts, Interdisciplinary Studies, Child & Family Outreach Program, Communication Studies, Social Work Program (part-time Master's), Journalism, Alcohol & Drug Studies, and Counseling Education & Developmental Psychology programs are offered in Spokane.

Admissions
The Carnegie Foundation for the Advancement of Teaching classifies the university as Inclusive, since the university admitted eighty-two percent of those who applied to be freshmen in 2010. The average incoming freshman had a combined SAT score of 970 and a high-school weighted grade-point average (GPA) of 3.17 in 2010. 86% of freshmen in 2010 were from Washington.

Research institutes & centers
Eastern Washington University is home to a number of research institutes and centers, including the following:

Institute for Public Policy & Economic Analysis—created in 2002 to "provide data and analysis about a variety of factors in the region that will be useful for businesses, communities and others as they plan for the future." Headed by Patrick Jones, Ph.D.
Women's & Gender Studies Center—Women's Studies programs at EWU empower women to achieve dignity and justice through education, scholarship, and social change.
Eisenhower Center/International Field Study—A program designed for students to travel abroad while earning college credit.
English Language Institute—ELI.
Center for Farm Health & Safety—Conducts research and demonstration programs involving Health and Safety of Farm-based population groups.
Fisheries Research Center— Performs a great variety of salmonid restoration studies including but not limited to: diet studies, population modeling, telemetry, bone regressions, bioenergetic modeling, water quality assessment, ecosystem modeling, surgical implantation of radio, acoustic and ultrasonic tags, and tributary sampling.

Student life

Pence Union Building (PUB)
The Pence Union Building, or PUB, is the community center for Eastern Washington University.

University Recreation Center (URC) 
The University Recreation Center, or URC, is a Three-Level  Recreational Facility that was opened on campus in 2008. The facility has a  multi-purpose arena that can operate as an ice rink and general purpose sports floor,  Indoor Climbing Wall with 11 routes (1 simulated Ice Climbing) & 2 bouldering walls, Indoor Parking Garage (40 Metered Spaces),  fitness Center & gymnasium, campus dining facility known as "The Roost" and a 2-Lane 200 Meter Running Track.

The cost to build the URC was $26.3 million, an amount which was jointly funded by the university and by students through a $65 per quarter activity fee. $28.6 million in revenue bonds were issued by the university in order to build the facility and pay the costs of issuance. The university funds the center's annual operating costs as part of its general operating budget.

Campus housing
Eastern Washington University has eight residence halls.

Brewster Hall was built in 2002 and houses students 19 years of age and older. Brewster is located on second street in downtown Cheney.

Dressler Hall was built in 1966. It is located behind the Pence Union Building (PUB) and is the closest hall to the Phase and Athletic Center. The majority of residents are freshmen. This hall and Pearce Hall, located adjacent to each other, hold a prominent and unique place in the EWU skyline. Built similarly to one another, though not identical, these twin halls are thirteen-story cylinders that rise prominently over the campus and the Cheney community.

Dryden Hall was built in 1965 and is located one block from the Pence Union Building. This hall caters to residents 21 and over. This hall is not currently operational.

Louise Anderson Hall, also known as LA Hall is centrally located directly across from the Pence Union Building (PUB) along Elm Street. The building was remodeled in 1999.

Morrison Hall was built in 1970 and is located about one block from the center of campus. Morrison Hall is not currently operational, as of the 2020/21 educational year.

Pearce Hall was the first of the twin circular towers to be constructed in 1964, and is the largest residence hall on campus. Pearce Hall is a community which is composed primarily of first-year students.

snyamncut (pronounced ) is EWU's newest residence hall. The name is the Salish word for place of gathering and was adopted to honor the Spokane Tribe.

Streeter Hall opened in 1968; on the north side of campus, it is near three other residence halls and approximately one block from the Pence Union Building.

EWU also has apartments. The two apartment complexes are Anna Maria and the Townhouses Apartments.

The Easterner
The Easterner is the student newspaper of Eastern Washington University. The Easterner provides the latest campus news, sports and opinions to students, faculty, alumni and the surrounding community. All content in The Easterner is either produced or chosen by students from the university. The Easterner is distributed in print form during the fall, winter and spring quarters on a weekly basis throughout the Cheney campus, Cheney business district, and the Riverpoint Campus. The Easterner maintains a website  and Facebook page, both independent from the university. The first student newspaper, "The State Normal School Journal", was published on October 10, 1916. The weekly publication changed its name to "The Easterner" in 1951.

Student organizations and Greek life
The student body's government, the Associated Students of Eastern Washington University, has been in existence since 1919–1920, and organizes the work of a wide range of student committees. The Office of Student Activities oversees more than 100 student clubs and organizations on campus that cater to a wide variety of interests and activities.

EWU is the only regional university in Washington that has an active Greek system on campus. As of the 2015–2016 school year, there are five IFC Fraternities, four NPC Sororities, five NPHC Chapters and eight NALFO Chapters that are currently active.

The five IFC Fraternities are Beta Theta Pi, Pi Lambda Phi, Sigma Phi Epsilon, Kappa Sigma and Phi Delta Theta. The four NPC Sororities are Alpha Omicron Pi, Alpha Phi, Alpha Xi Delta, and Gamma Phi Beta. The eight NALFO Organizations are Lambda Theta Alpha, Kappa Delta Chi, Gamma Alpha Omega, Sigma Lambda Gamma, Alpha Pi Sigma, Sigma Lambda Beta, Lambda Theta Phi, and Omega Delta Phi. The five NPHC Organizations are Delta Sigma Theta, Alpha Phi Alpha, Phi Beta Sigma, Zeta Phi Beta, and Iota Phi Theta.

Athletics

Eastern Washington University offers club, intramural, and varsity sports. Its twelve varsity men's and women's sports teams compete in the Big Sky Conference of the National Collegiate Athletic Association's Division I as the Eastern Washington Eagles. The most-prominent athletics facilities on campus are Roos Field, Reese Court and the Jim Thorpe Fieldhouse. EWU has three national championships, including football (2010 – NCAA Div. I FCS), wrestling (1977 – NAIA) and men's cross country (1982 – NCAA Div. II).

The Seattle Seahawks of the National Football League held the majority of their summer training camps at EWU, from 1976 to 1985 and again from 1997 to 2006, from late July to mid August.

Notable alumni

Tom Ackerman, former NFL center
Ernie Afaganis, Canadian sportscaster, particularly for CBC Television
Lamont Brightful, former NFL cornerback
Demitrius Bronson, former NFL running back for the Seattle Seahawks
R.W. Buzzard, judge
Jesse Chatman, former running back for the New York Jets of the National Football League
Dave Christensen, offensive coordinator at the University of Utah
Elizabeth Cook-Lynn, Native American activist and writer
Colin Cowherd, host of The Herd with Colin Cowherd on FS1 and I Heart radio
Chris Crutcher, author of young adult novels
Dan Curley, former NFL tight end and fullback
Terry Davis, author
Ramsey Denison, documentary filmmaker, director, producer, editor
Wendy J. Fox, author
Thomas Hampson, Grammy-nominated opera singer
Taiwan Jones, NFL running back for the Buffalo Bills
Brandon Kaufman, former NFL wide receiver for the Buffalo Bills
Edward Kienholz, installation artist
Cooper Kupp, NFL wide receiver for the Los Angeles Rams
Ali bin Ahmed Al Kuwari, Qatari Minister of Finance
Bashir Levingston, former CFL All-Star
Austin McBroom, YouTube star
Jim McElwain, former head football coach at the University of Florida
Todd McFarlane, creator of the Spawn comic book series and former co-owner of the NHL's Edmonton Oilers
Launi Meili, gold medalist in women's three-position smallbore rifle shooting at the 1992 Summer Olympics
Erik Meyer, quarterback for Spokane Shock
Aaron Olson, former Australian NBL player for the New Zealand Breakers
Jeff Ogden, former NFL wide receiver
Ryan Phillips, former CFL All-Star
Margaret Rayburn, educator, member of the Washington House of Representatives
Michael Roos, former NFL offensive tackle for the Tennessee Titans
Kendrick Bourne, NFL Wide Receiver for the New England Patriots
Kevin Sargent, former NFL offensive tackle
Kurt Schulz, former NFL player
Ed Simmons, NFL offensive lineman for 11 years for the Washington Redskins, 2x Super Bowl champion
Tom Sneva, former race car driver, Indianapolis 500 winner in 1983
Rodney Stuckey, former NBA player for the Indiana Pacers
Isaiah Trufant, former NFL cornerback for the New York Jets, younger brother of former Seattle Seahawks cornerback, Marcus Trufant
Raul Vijil, former AFL player for the Spokane Shock
Gary Volesky, Lieutenant General U.S. Army, Corps Commander
Jess Walter, #1 New York Times best-selling author
Lee Watkinson, professional poker player

References

Notes

External links

Eastern Washington University Athletics website

 
Public universities and colleges in Washington (state)
Universities and colleges accredited by the Northwest Commission on Colleges and Universities
Educational institutions established in 1882
National Register of Historic Places in Spokane County, Washington
University and college buildings on the National Register of Historic Places in Washington (state)
1882 establishments in Washington Territory
Cheney, Washington